The 7th Ukrainian Verkhovna Rada began its term on 12 December 2012. 478 people's deputies were elected during the 2012 Ukrainian parliamentary elections.

References

2012-2014